System Crash is a Canadian youth sketch comedy television show, which aired on YTV from 1999 to 2001.

The series centred on a group of students in a junior high school media club, telling the events of their fictional school, Lambton Junior High, in the past week. Each episode usually had a theme, e.g. parents.

Recurring segments
Fly on the Wall - Uses hidden cameras to show what happens when no one is looking (e.g. why girls go to the bathroom in pairs and what do they do once they're in there?)
Burnbaum Helps - Burnbaum helping people. However, it always ends badly for the person that asks for help. It was replaced with Battleford Helps when Burnbaum left the show.
Canadian Council for Concerned Kids - Zoe's informative 'public service announcement' styled segment, providing important messages to adults on the way they should treat and interact with their children.
Garage Band - During the first season (1999), several of the episodes ended with a Garage Band segment. It featured members of the Canadian band Serial Joe playing humorous songs with the principal cast.
Lambton News - Talks about current events. Hosted by Carla Waller in the first season and Emily Pereira afterwards.
Sports Update - An update on sports at the school. Hosted by Wedgie Goldstein in the first season and Noogie Monoham (Zach Pettiford) afterwards.
Lambton Legends - Looking back at various legendary athletes and other famous Lambton alumni.
Lambton Home Shopping - Beau Peterson sells useless products and inventions to the students of Lambton via a Home Shopping Network styled-show.
Movie Spoofs - Movies of all kinds were constantly spoofed - Examples include Gladiator, Cast Away, Star Wars, The Maltese Falcon, The Incredible Hulk, The Matrix, E.T., Jaws, etc.
Kyle's Notes - Kyle Cooper giving unreliable lectures and his notes. This was used during the first season and ended when Ryan Field left the show.

Cast

Season 1
Nathaniel Siegler (as Nathan Burnbaum)
Haleigh Sheehan (as Zoe McLaughlan-Fernandez)
Kendra FitzRandolph (as Bridget Hendrickson)
Tony Del Rio (as William 'Tek' Gibson)
Ryan Field (as Kyle Copper)
Alithea Watters (as Carla Waller)
Shamba Amani (as Mr. Cooper)

Season 2
Nathaniel Siegler (as Nathan Burnbaum)
Haleigh Sheehan (as Zoe McLaughlan-Fernandez)
Kendra FitzRandolph (as Bridget Hendrickson)
Tony Del Rio (as William 'Tek' Gibson)
Owen Rotharmel (as Beau Peterson)

Season 3
Nathaniel Siegler (as Nathan Burnbaum)
Haleigh Sheehan (as Zoe McLaughlan-Fernandez)
Kendra FitzRandolph (as Bridget Hendrickson)
Owen Rotharmel (as Beau Peterson)
Rajiv Surendra (as Chuck Singh)
Jordan Dawe

Season 4
Haleigh Sheehan (as Zoe McLaughlan-Fernandez)
Owen Rotharmel (as Beau Peterson)
Connor Lynch (as Bobby Battleford)
Esmeralda Smith-Romero (as Samantha Briggs)
Nathan Stephenson (as James Alexander)

References

External links

1999 Canadian television series debuts
2002 Canadian television series endings
1990s Canadian children's television series
2000s Canadian children's television series
1990s Canadian sketch comedy television series
2000s Canadian sketch comedy television series
Canadian children's comedy television series
Children's sketch comedy
English-language television shows
Middle school television series
Television series about teenagers
Television series by Corus Entertainment
Television shows filmed in Toronto
Television shows set in Toronto
YTV (Canadian TV channel) original programming